Regi Van Acker (born 25 April 1955 in Beveren, Belgium) is a Belgian footballer and coach who is currently managing Dender in Belgian First Division B.

He is known for his career as a football technician. He has coached KV Courtrai, Royal Antwerp F.C. twice, Casino SW Bregenz (Austrian Football Bundesliga), K Lierse SK and KV Red Star Waasland.

He won promotion with Dender in the 2021–22 season.

References

External links
Profile at Soccerway

Belgian footballers
Belgian football managers
K.V. Kortrijk managers
Royal Antwerp F.C. managers
Lierse S.K. managers
K.R.C. Mechelen managers
S.C. Eendracht Aalst managers
K.M.S.K. Deinze managers
Living people
1955 births
People from Beveren
Sportkring Sint-Niklaas players
Association footballers not categorized by position
Footballers from East Flanders